The list of airports in the  United States is broken down into separate lists due to the large number of airports.

Primary airports 
Public-use and military airports in each U.S. state and territory can be found on the following lists:

Airports in the United States that provide scheduled passenger services and have over 10,000 passenger boardings per year are classified as primary airports by the Federal Aviation Administration.

This list of primary airports contains the following information:
 CITY – The city generally associated with the airport. This is not always the actual location since some airports are located in smaller towns outside of the city they serve.
 FAA – The location identifier assigned by the Federal Aviation Administration (FAA). These are linked to that airport's page in the state's airport directory, where available.
 IATA – The airport code assigned by the International Air Transport Association (IATA). Those that do not match the FAA code are shown in bold.
 ICAO – The location indicator assigned by the International Civil Aviation Organization (ICAO).
 AIRPORT – The official airport name.
 ROLE – One of four FAA airport categories. This list only includes airports designated as Commercial service – primary (P). Each primary airport is further classified by the FAA as one of the following four "hub" types:
 L: Large hub that accounts for at least 1% of total U.S. passenger enplanements (Generally 18,500,000 total passengers and above).
 M: Medium hub that accounts for between 0.25% and 1% of total U.S. passenger enplanements (Generally 3,500,000-18,500,000 total passengers). This would make PDX a "Medium Hub" by total passengers, but a "Large Hub" under enplanements.
 S: Small hub that accounts for between 0.05% and 0.25% of total U.S. passenger enplanements (Generally 500,000-3,500,000 total passengers).
 N: Nonhub that accounts for less than 0.05% of total U.S. passenger enplanements, but more than 10,000 annual enplanements
 ENPLANEMENTS – The number of enplanements (commercial passenger boardings) that occurred at the airport in calendar year 2019 as per FAA records.

See also 
 List of the busiest airports in the United States
 Essential Air Service
 Wikipedia:WikiProject Aviation/Airline destination lists: North America#United States of America

References 
Federal Aviation Administration (FAA):
 FAA Airport Data (Form 5010) from National Flight Data Center (NFDC), also available from AirportIQ 5010
 National Plan of Integrated Airport Systems (2011–2015), released 4 October 2010
 Passenger Boarding (Enplanement) Data for CY 2019 and 2020, updated November 8, 2021

Also see individual state lists for additional references.

Footnotes 

List
United States